Sam Miller Hill is a mountain in Sullivan County, New York. It is located northeast of Long Eddy. Cherry Ridge is located west and Hawks Nest is located southwest of Sam Miller Hill.

References

Mountains of Sullivan County, New York
Mountains of New York (state)